Sathiala is a village located in the Amritsar District, in the Indian state of Punjab. It is located 5 km from Beas.

The Guru Nanak Dev University regional campus is located at this village.

References 

Villages in Amritsar district